Rachel Berman (raised as Susan King; 1946-May 28, 2014) was an American-born Canadian painter and children's book illustrator,  who lived and worked in Canada, the United States, and Ireland.

Her paintings have been likened to the poems of Leonard Cohen, the plays of Harold Pinter, and "a season's worth of Masterpiece Theatre episodes." The mysterious figures and hidden stories glimpsed in her paintings are a reflection of the mysteries Berman has unravelled in her own life. Once known as Susan King, she discovered her original birth name, birth date, and the names of her biological parents when she was 52. This experience led her to reclaim her long-lost name.

Berman was born in New Orleans, Louisiana and lived in Victoria, British Columbia.

Exhibitions
Berman exhibited extensively across Canada and internationally and was represented by Ingram Gallery in Toronto, Ontario.

International Art Fairs

 2009	  Toronto International Art Fair, Ingram Gallery, Toronto, ON
 2008	  Toronto International Art Fair, Ingram Gallery, Toronto, ON
 2007	  Toronto International Art Fair, Ingram Gallery, Toronto, ON
 2006	  Toronto International Art Fair, Ingram Gallery, Toronto, ON
 2005	  Toronto International Art Fair, Ingram Gallery, Toronto, ON
 2004	  Toronto International Art Fair, Ingram Gallery, Toronto, ON
 2003	  Toronto International Art Fair, Ingram Gallery, Toronto, ON
 2002	  Toronto International Art Fair, Ingram Gallery, Toronto, ON
 2001	  Toronto International Art Fair, Ingram Gallery, Toronto, ON

Solo Exhibitions

 2009	  Ingram Gallery, Toronto, ON, "Bradley McGogg, The Very Fine Frog"
 2008	  Ingram Gallery, Toronto, ON, "Hourglass"					
 2006	  Ingram Gallery, Toronto, ON, "In a Station in a Metro"
 2005	  Ingram Gallery, Toronto, ON, "Or There or Elsewhere"
 2003	  Ingram Gallery, Toronto, ON, "An Optimism Under Heaven"
 2001	  Ingram Gallery, Toronto, ON, "Travelling"
				 
Selected Group Exhibitions

 2010    Ingram Gallery, Toronto, "Owles | Sniderhan | Berman"
 2009	  Ingram Gallery, Toronto, ON, "Summer Series"
 2009	  Ingram Gallery, Toronto, ON, "Works on Paper"
 2005	  Ingram Gallery, Toronto, ON, "Toy Box"			
 2004	  Ingram Gallery, Toronto, ON, "Stumble Home - with Jon Claytor"
 2004	  Ingram Gallery, Toronto, ON, "Greyscale"			
 2004	  Ingram Gallery, Toronto, ON, "Life of the Party"		
 2003	  Ingram Gallery, Toronto, ON, "The Water Project - 67% Bodies of Water"
 2002	  Ingram Gallery, Toronto, ON, "Outside In"		
 2002	  Ingram Gallery, Toronto, ON, "Figure Out"		
 2001 	  Ingram Gallery, Toronto, ON, "Cinematic Situation"	
 2000	  Ingram Fine Art, Toronto, ON, "Artists for the New Millennium"

Children's books
Rachel Berman is the illustrator of the following books:
 Pigmalion, written by Glenda Leznoff and published by Crocodile Books (December 2001)
 Bradley McGogg, the Very Fine Frog, written by Tim Beiser and published by Tundra Books (March 2009)
 Miss Mousie's Blind Date, written by Tim Beiser and published by Tundra Books (October 2012)

In 2009, and again in 2013, Rachel was nominated for the Governor General's award for English Language Children's Literature-Illustration.

References

External links
 Ingram Gallery album of Rachel Berman paintings
 McClelland & Stewart Author Spotlight: Rachel Berman
 Artists in Canada.com interview with Rachel Berman
 Blog about Rachel's letters to Tmbk2

2014 deaths
1946 births
American emigrants to Canada
Artists from New Orleans
Artists from Victoria, British Columbia
Canadian women painters
Canadian illustrators